The Ford Mach I, also known as the Ford Levacar Mach I, is a concept car hovercraft developed by the Ford Motor Company in the 1950s. The Mach I was a single-seat automobile which rode on pressurized air, not wheels. Its name was inspired by the speed Mach 1, an aspiration speed not yet achieved by vehicles at the time. In experiments,  was used so that  was needed for levitation and  propelled it .

The Levacar project was led by Andrew A. Kucher (a Ford Vice-President for Engineering and Research) and David J. Jay (a Senior Development Engineer). Kucher had initially conceived the concept around 1930. One of the lead designers was Gale Halderman, known for being, the initial designer of the Ford Mustang. In addition to the Mach I automobile, the project also developed a similarly outfitted scooter, the Levascooter.

The Mach I was displayed for about two years in the late 1950s in Dearborn, Michigan.

See also
Hovercar
Hoverboard
Maglev
Supercar (TV series)

References

External links
Ford Mach I at allcarindex.com

Mach I
Hovercraft